Pronatura may refer to:

 Pronatura México, Mexican environmental conservation group
 Pronatura Noreste, one of six regional offices of Pronatura México
 Pro-Natura International, Paris-based environmental and poverty alleviation NGO
 Pro Natura (Switzerland), Switzerland's oldest environmental organisation